This is a list of libraries in Hong Kong.

Public libraries and other libraries open to the public
The Hong Kong Public Library consists of 65 libraries organised by district.

University libraries
The Chinese University of Hong Kong
Architecture Library
Ch'ien Mu Library, New Asia College
Li Ping Medical Library
Elisabeth Luce Moore Library, Chung Chi College
University Library
Wu Chung Multimedia Library, United College
City University of Hong Kong
Run Run Shaw Library
Chu Hai College of Higher Education

The Hong Kong Academy for Performing Arts

Hong Kong Baptist University

The Hong Kong Institute of Education (now called The Education University of Hong Kong).

The Hong Kong Polytechnic University

The Hong Kong University of Science and Technology

Lingnan University
Fong Sum Wood Library
The Hong Kong Metropolitan University

Hong Kong Shue Yan University

The University of Hong Kong
Dental Library
HKU Education Library
HKU Fung Ping Shan Library
HKU Lui Che Woo Law Library
HKU Main Library
HKU Music Library
HKU Yu Chun Keung Medical Library

Private libraries

Kwang Hwa Information and Cultural Center
Sun Yat Sen Library
 Christian Science Reading Room
Helena May Library

External links
 Hong Kong Public Libraries

 
Libraries
Hong Kong
Libraries